The Ambulance Service (Emergency Duties) Long Service and Good Conduct Medal is a long service medal of the United Kingdom established in 1995.  The medal is awarded to recognise long service by all clinical grades of the ambulance services who serve on emergency duty.

Criteria
The Ambulance Service (Emergency Duties) Long Service and Good Conduct Medal is presented for 20 years commendable service to all clinical grades, such as Associate Ambulance Practitioners (AAP), Ambulance Technicians, A&E Support Clinicians, Ambulance Nurses, Community First Responders (CFR trained), Emergency Ambulance Crews (EAC), Paramedics and Ambulance Officers employed in emergency duties in the ambulance services across the United Kingdom. Full-time, part-time and voluntary service qualify. For ambulance officers, at least seven of their 20 years service must have been spent on emergency duties as a clinical grade.

Support staff and Non-clinical grades, such as 999 Call takers and Dispatchers, Ambulance Care Assistants (Non-Emergency Patient Transport Service), Emergency Care Assistants (ECA), Emergency Care Support Workers (ECSW) and Emergency Vehicle Operators (EVO) do not automatically qualify, however, can be nominated by senior management for consideration, if length of service and good conduct criteria on emergency duties are met.

Service prior to 1974 in an ambulance service maintained by a local authority may also be counted. There is no provision for ribbon clasps to recognise further periods of service.

The bodies covered by the medal are the various ambulance services trusts in England; the ambulance services of Scotland, Wales, Northern Ireland, the Isle of Man and the  States of Jersey; and the Guernsey Ambulance and Rescue Service.

Appearance
The medal is circular,  in diameter, and made of cupro-nickel. The obverse bears the crowned effigy of the reigning sovereign, surrounded by the royal titles, ELIZABETH II DEI GRATIA REGINA F.D. The reverse depicts the insignia of the NHS ambulance services trusts or, for awards in Scotland that of the Scottish Ambulance Service, with the words FOR EXEMPLARY SERVICE above.

References

Civil awards and decorations of the United Kingdom
Awards established in 1996
Long and Meritorious Service Medals of Britain and the Commonwealth
1996 establishments in the United Kingdom
Ambulance services in the United Kingdom